The Gambler from Natchez is a 1954 American Western film directed by Henry Levin and starring Dale Robertson and Debra Paget.

Plot
After four years away from New Orleans, Vance Colby is summoned by his gambler father. On a riverboat, a gambler named Gottfried accuses him of cheating. Vance beats him into submission, but when Vance's back is turned, Gottfried comes after him with a baling hook. Riverboat captain Barbee's attractive daughter Melanie intervenes to save Vance.

Ashore, Vance comes to the aid of Ivette Rivage when her carriage's horse goes lame. At her family plantation, Araby, he meets her brother André and fiancé Claude St. Germaine, who become noticeably less friendly when they learn that he is Chip Colby's son. After Vance departs, André sends his henchman Etienne and two others to ambush him. Etienne throws a knife that pierces Vance's side, but he manages to shoot Etienne in the arm and escape in a small boat. He is spotted by Melanie, and his wound is treated by Barbee after Josh pulls the knife carefully out. Barbee informs Vance that his father once saved Barbee from losing his riverboat to a card sharp.

When Vance goes to see his father, he finds a coffin. The elder Colby was accused of cheating and shot by Rivage. Rivage's claim is backed by casino owner Nicholas Cadiz and a waiter name René Garonne. Vance abducts Garonne and pressures him into telling the truth. Chip Colby and Rivage were playing 21 in a private room at Cadiz's establishment. Rivage lost his brand new riverboat, the Baton Rouge, to Colby, then insisted on one more hand, wagering Araby against the Baton Rouge. After he lost, he became enraged and shot Colby. Cruz then placed a marked deck in the dead man's hand. Garonne also reveals that Rivage, St. Germaine, Cadiz and Colby were partners in the riverboat. However, Garonne is taken in the middle of the night, leaving Colby with no proof.

Vance's enemies try to frame him by planting Garonne's body in his hotel room, but St. Germaine is caught in the act. With Vance in pursuit, St. Germaine falls to his death.

Vance then has Barbee gamble at Cruz's casino. Barbee secretly marks the cards, so that when Vance brings Commissioner Renard, he can "prove" that Cruz is cheating his patrons. Renard revokes Cruz's license. Cruz strikes Vance in the face, which leads to a duel. Before the pistol duel, Vance gets Cruz to bet his stake in the Baton Rouge against Vance's inheritance of $50,000. Cruz fires, but only nicks Vance's cheek. Vance holds his fire, offering to spare Cruz if he will confess what really happened to Vance's father. Cruz agrees, but then draws a derringer, and Vance kills him.

When Rivage's final scheme fails, involving sending his sister to Vance's room, he challenges Vance to one hand of 21, each wagering their half share of the Baton Rouge. When Vance wins, Rivage once again bets Araby against the riverboat. He loses again, just as he did against Vance's father. He then draws his cane sword and attacks the unarmed Vance. Melanie throws Vance a sword, and a prolonged duel ensues. Etienne waits to throw his knife, but Josh deals with him. Then Vance kills Rivage.

Afterward, Vance returns the estate's deed to a grateful Ivette. She invites him to stay with her, but he has other plans, which include Melanie.

Cast
 Dale Robertson as Vance Colby
 Debra Paget as Melanie Barbee 
 Thomas Gomez as Captain Antoine Barbee
 Lisa Daniels as Ivette Rivage
 Kevin McCarthy as André Rivage
 Douglas Dick as Claude St. Germaine
 John Wengraf as Nicholas Cadiz 
 Donald Randolph as Pierre Bonet
 Henri Letondal as Police Commissioner Robert Renard
 Jay Novello as René Garonne
 Woody Strode as Josh

See also
 List of American films of 1954

References

External links
 
 
 

1954 films
20th Century Fox films
American Western (genre) films
1954 Western (genre) films
Films directed by Henry Levin
Films set in New Orleans
Films about gambling
Films set in the 19th century
1950s English-language films
1950s American films